Inni (Within) is a live motion picture and album by Icelandic band Sigur Rós released in 2011. The concert footage was directed by Vincent Morisset and filmed at the Alexandra Palace in 2008. It was released on 7 November 2011 on various formats, including vinyl, DVD, Blu-ray and CD. Theatrical versions were shown around the world in late 2011.

It contains live tracks from all but one of the band's albums, and prominently features their (at-the-time most recent) album, Með suð í eyrum við spilum endalaust. Two tracks were released for free download off the band's website from the album, "Ný Batterí" and "Festival", and "E-Bow" was also made available for download with every pre-order of the package.

Editions 
The commercial package for Inni is released in five different editions: 
 'Digital download' edition of the motion picture on .mp4 and/or album on .wav or .mp3
 'Standard' edition featuring the motion picture on DVD and the album on double CD
 'Blu-ray' edition with the motion picture on Blu-ray and DVD and the album on double CD
 'Vinyl/DVD' edition with the motion picture on DVD and the album on both double CD and triple vinyl
 'Limited special' edition (6996 copies), released in Iceland, featuring special packaging, the Blu-ray, DVDs (NTSC and PAL versions) and double CD as well as a 7" coloured vinyl of the song "Lúppulagið" and additional bonus material.

Critical reception 

Inni has received mostly positive reviews from music critics. At Metacritic, which assigns a normalised rating out of 100 to reviews from mainstream critics, the album received an average score of 78, based on 18 reviews, indicating "generally favorable reviews". 
Marc Hogan from Spin wrote: "After three-plus years without fresh Sigur Rós material, though, the real treat is the contemplatively buzzing, ambient finale "Lúppulagid"—an honest-to-goodness new song."  
Melissa Maerz from Entertainment Weekly commented that "the DVD captures the 75-minute buildup of guitars, xylophones, piccolos, and frontman Jónsi's cherubic voice, until it reaches its epic finale on the ethereal new swooner Lúppulagid." Kevin Liedel from Slant Magazine awarded the album three out of five stars and wrote: "Inni is beautiful and alluring, yes, but ultimately a recycled bit of nostalgia likely to please very few."

Motion picture track listing 
 "Ný batterí"
 "Svefn-g-englar"
 "Fljótavík"
 "Inní mér syngur vitleysingur"
 "Sæglópur"
 "Festival"
 "E-Bow"
 "Popplagið"
 "Lúppulagið"
DVD/Blu-ray bonus tracks:
 "All Alright"
 "Glósóli"
 "Hafsól"
 "Við spilum endalaust"
The DVDs (but not the Blu-Ray) in the 'limited special' edition include an extra bonus track, "Klippa" ("Cut"), a short movie directed by Sarah Hopper, with ambient music by the band and sound design by Matthew Herbert. This edition includes a hand-cut piece of the outfits the band wore during the two concerts in a machine-numbered envelope in each copy, and the movie shows three actors starting this process in a highly-stylized setting. This movie was also made available to watch on the band's official YouTube and Vimeo accounts.

CD track listing

Vinyl track listing

Personnel 
 Jón Þór Birgisson – vocals, guitar, piano, pump organ, keyboards, bass
 Kjartan Sveinsson – keyboards, guitar, backup vocals, flute
 Georg Hólm – bass, toy piano
 Orri Páll Dýrason – drums, keyboards, xylophone

References

External links 
 

Sigur Rós albums
2011 video albums
2011 live albums
British documentary films